Vladimir Sergeyevich Lyuksemburg (30 October 1888 - 23 June 1971)  was a Russian revolutionary, politician and member of the first Bolshevik government of Ukraine (People's Secretariat).

In 1918-1919 he was a member of collegium of the People's Commissariat of Propaganda and Agitation.

References

External  links
Vladimir Lyuksemburg at Ukrinform.
Memorial plate for Lyuksemburg

1888 births
1971 deaths
Politicians from Saint Petersburg
Saint Petersburg State University alumni
Soviet propagandists
Central Committee of the Communist Party of the Soviet Union members
Old Bolsheviks
Justice ministers of Ukraine
Members of the All-Ukrainian Central Executive Committee
People of the Russian Revolution
NKVD
Institute of Red Professors alumni